Lower Circular Road Cemetery, also known as General Episcopal Cemetery, is located on the crossing of Mother Teresa Sarani (former Park Street) and Acharya Jagadish Chandra Bose Road (former Lower Circular Road), Kolkata, India, with its entrance on Acharya Jagadish Chandra Bose Road.

History
Lower Circular Road Cemetery was established on 1840 and is still operating as a functional cemetery. It contains approximately 12,000 graves including many former British East India Company employees. There are two Second World War Commonwealth war graves, of an officer of the British Indian Army and a purser of the BOAC.

Notable graves
 Charles Freer Andrews (died 1940)
 Leslie Claudius (died 2012)
 Henri Hover Locke
 Michael Madhusudan Dutt (died 1873)
 Jules Henri Jean Schaumburg
 Henry Whitelock Torrens (died 1852)
 John Elliot Drinkwater Bethune (died 1851)
 David Drummond
 Neil O'Brien (died 2016)
 William Hay Macnaghten

References

External links
Photos:
 Entrance
 General view
 Graves 1

Cemeteries in India
Christianity in Kolkata
1840 establishments in British India